The Musée Geo-Charles is a museum located in Échirolles, near Grenoble, France.

The museum is home to some of the personal collection of the poet Géo-Charles. It was established by the city of Échirolles in 1982 and was installed in an old mansion that belonged to the Société de la Viscose.

The museum houses the collections and archives received as donation by Lucienne Géo-Charles, from the personal collection of his husband. These collections particularly show the works of the first half of the 20th century, the School of Paris. There are paintings, sculptures, prints of artists who were next to Géo-Charles, including André Derain, Delaunay, Fernand Léger, Frans Masereel. Most of the works presented are related to sports as subjects of art.

There are often temporary exhibitions. Several developments of the museum are planned.

References

Art museums established in 1982
Museums in Grenoble
Art museums and galleries in France
Biographical museums in France
Literary museums in France
Poetry museums
Musee Geo-Charles